Vermenton is a commune in the Yonne department in Bourgogne-Franche-Comté in north-central France. On 1 January 2016, the former commune of Sacy was merged into Vermenton. The remains of the former Cistercian Reigny Abbey are situated here.

See also
Communes of the Yonne department

References

Communes of Yonne